Estefanía Fontanini (born February 14, 1988) is an Argentine sprint canoer who competed in the late 2000s. At the 2008 Summer Olympics in Beijing, she was eliminated in the heats of the K-1 500 m event.

References
Sports-Reference.com profile

1988 births
Argentine female canoeists
Canoeists at the 2008 Summer Olympics
Living people
Olympic canoeists of Argentina